Otto Liebing (31 March 1891 – 7 November 1967) was a German rower who competed for the German Empire in the 1912 Summer Olympics,  as bowman. The German team won the bronze medal in the eight.

1912 German Men's eights rowing team
Otto Liebing
Max Bröske
Fritz Bartholomae
Willi Bartholomae
Werner Dehn
Rudolf Reichelt
Hans Matthiae
Kurt Runge
Max Vetter

References

External links
profile

1891 births
1967 deaths
Rowers at the 1912 Summer Olympics
Olympic rowers of Germany
Olympic bronze medalists for Germany
Olympic medalists in rowing
German male rowers
Medalists at the 1912 Summer Olympics